Pauline Vogelpoel MBE (24 April 1926 in Lourenço Marques, Portuguese East Africa – 22 December 2002 in Basle, Switzerland) was a South African arts administrator. She was educated at both Herschel Girls' School and Rustenburg Girls' School in Cape Town and received a degree in Fine Art from the University of Cape Town. She became engaged to a Rhodesian, Buster St Quintin, an aide to the Governor Sir Godfrey Huggins. In 1950, she followed her brother Louis, a cardiologist and a world expert on wild flowers with an orchid named after him, to London. Beatrice Janice introduced her to the Art Institute of Chicago and got her a job in New York helping Douglas McCaigie of the Museum of Modern Art. She joined the Contemporary Art Society as Organising Secretary in 1954, becoming Director in 1976. In 1975, she married the banker David Mann. In 1982 he joined a private bank in Basle] and she left her job at the Contemporary Art Society to move to Switzerland with him. She became the Zürich editor of Harpers and Queen magazine. In 1997 she joined the International Council of the Tate Gallery. She recorded her memories for the National Sound Archive's Artists' Lives project at the British Library Sound Archive. She received an MBE in 1962.
She died of a brain tumour in Basle on 22 December 2002, aged 76.

External links
 Obituary: Pauline Vogelpoel; Director of the Contemporary Art Society
 "Obituary: Pauline Vogelpoel" The Independent
 "Pauline Vogelpoel" The Times

Members of the Order of the British Empire
1926 births
2002 deaths
Michaelis School of Fine Art alumni
Alumni of Rustenburg School for Girls
Alumni of Herschel Girls' School
South African Members of the Order of the British Empire